Fungwa, or Ura (Ula; known as Ɓura-wa in Hausa) is a Kainji language in Pandogari, Niger State, Nigeria. The same word is also used for the people; Roger Blench estimated their numbers at no more than 1,000. Farming is the main occupation of the Fungwa while pottery is also an occupation practised by the women. The Fungwa live in the five villages of Gulbe, Gabi Tukurbe, Urenciki, Renga (Ringa) and Utana along the Pandogari–Allawa road in Rafi, Nigeria.

Gallery

See also
Pongu language, also known as Rin

References

External links 

 ELAR collection: Documentation of Cifungwa Folktales deposited by Samuel Akinbo

Shiroro languages
Languages of Nigeria